Lake Badger is a lake in South Dakota, in the United States.

Lake Badger was named for the frequent badgers near it.

See also
List of lakes in South Dakota

References

Lakes of South Dakota
Lakes of Kingsbury County, South Dakota